Brooks K. Mould was a Chicago-based music publisher, whose "Garden City Polka" was the first piece of music to be published in Chicago. He also owned a music store, and his publishing career was successful from 1847 to 1859.

References

Notes

Year of birth missing
Year of death missing
American music publishers (people)
Businesspeople from Chicago